Allium vasilevskajae, or Vasilevskaya's onion, is a species of onion that is endemic to Syunik Province in Armenia. It was found in stony places and on screes in the upper montane zone, from elevations of 2,200–2,300 m. It is only known from two collections made half a century ago.

References

vasilevskajae
Endemic flora of Armenia